Prince Abdulla is the given name for Prince Ibrahim Faamuladheyri Kilegefan, son of Sultan Muhammad Ghiyasuddin of the Dhiyamigili dynasty.

After protests over the assassination of his father Sultan Muhammad Ghiyasuddin, Prince Abdulla was banished to Fuvahmulah.

Family
According to ancient genealogical books of Meedhoo, Isdu dynasty has its roots in Meedhoo and Fua Mulah. Some of the royalties of the Maldives have their roots one way or the other connected with Meedhoo.

When the young prince was banished to Fuvahmulah he was taken care of by his relatives. He had lived all his life in the region with his children taking important roles in Maldives political history.

Princess Aisha Didi 
Princess Aisha Didi ( Don Aisa Didi / Doshee Didi ) was the eldest daughter of Abdulla from his marriage to Kudarania Edhurugey Mariyam Manikufaanu.

Aisha Didi had 6 children.

She had 2 children from her first marriage to Kon'dey Ali Manikufaanu ( Grandson of Sultan Ibrahim Mudzhiruddine )

 1) Kon'dey Didi (Dhon Didi)
 2) Thukkalaa Didi

And second marriage to Meedhoo Gan'duvaru Mohammed Thakurufaanu with 4 children.

 3) Meedhoo Gan'duvaru Khadija Didi
 4) Meedhoo Gan'duvaru Hassan Didi ( Maternal grandfather of Ibrahim Nasir )
 5) Meedhoo Gan'duvaru Ahmed Didi
 6) Meedhoo Gan'duvaru Aminath Didi

Ibrahim Nasir 
Ibrahim Nasir was born to Ahmad Didi of the famous Velaanaage family and Nayaage Aishath Didi. Nasir is descended from the famous Huraa and Dhiyamigili royal dynasties of the Maldives. Nasir's mother, Aishath Didi, was the daughter of Moosa Didi, son of Dhadimagu Ganduvaru Maryam Didi, daughter of Husain Didi, son of Al-Nabeel Karayye Hassan Didi, son of Prince Ibrahim Faamuladheyri Kilegefan, son of Sultan Muhammed Ghiya'as ud-din, son of Sultan Ibrahim Iskandar II, son of Sultan Muhammad Imaduddin II of the Dhiyamigili dynasty.

Moosa Didi 
Moosa Didi was the eldest son of Abdulla who married S.Maradhoo Mudhingey Mariyam Manikufaanu.

They had 5 children.

 1) (Maradhoo) Ibrahim Didi + Hithadhoo Dhaleykaage Dhondhiye ( Aminath Manikfaan)
 2) Hawwa Didi 
 3) Ahmed Didi ( Offspring in Huvadhoo Atoll ) - Addu Afeef Didi's maternal grandfather.
 4) Aminath Didi + Ganduvaru Dhon Raha (s/o) Ibrahim Manikufaanu (Gan'duvaru Bodu Raha) son of Bandeyri Hassan Manikufaanu
 5) Mohamed Didi

Afeef Didi 
Moosa Didi is the maternal ancestral grandfather of Afeef Didi.

Afeef Didi's mother is Fathima Didi daughter of Aishath Didi daughter of (Gan'duvaru) Dhon Didi daughter of Aminath Didi daughter of Maradhoo Mudhingey Mariyam Manikufaan and An-Nabeel Moosa Didi (Kilegefaanuge Moosa Didi) son of Al-Ameer Abdulla (Ibrahim Faamuladheyri Kilegefaan) who is the only surviving son of Sultan Mohamed Ghiyasuddin son of Sultan Ibrahim Iskandar II son of Sultan Mohamed Imaduddin Al-Muzaffar (Imaduddin II) of Dhiyamigili Dynasty.

References

Maldivian nobility